Markus Eibegger (born 16 October 1984) is an Austrian former professional road bicycle racer, who rode professionally between 2007 and 2018. He was the winner of the Austrian National Road Race Championships in 2009.

Major results

2005
 5th Overall Jadranska Magistrala
 9th GP Judendorf-Strassengel
2006
 1st Overall Grand Prix Guillaume Tell
 1st Salzkammergut-Giro
 4th Overall Thüringen Rundfahrt der U23
2007
 1st Giro di Festina
 2nd Road race, National Road Championships
 3rd Overall Route du Sud
 4th GP Triberg-Schwarzwald
 9th Overall Settimana Ciclistica Lombarda
2009
 1st  Road race, National Road Championships
 1st GP Judendorf-Strassengel
 1st Stage 2 Istrian Spring Trophy
 5th Overall Bayern–Rundfahrt
1st Stage 2
2010
 2nd Raiffeisen Grand Prix
 6th Overall Tour de Langkawi
2011
 1st  Overall Tour de Taiwan
1st Stage 4
 2nd Overall Tour de Korea
 4th Overall Kerman Tour
 4th Overall Oberösterreich Rundfahrt
1st Stage 3
 8th Overall Jelajah Malaysia
2012
 1st  Overall Istrian Spring Trophy
1st Stage 2
 7th Trofeo Zsšdi
 8th Ljubljana–Zagreb
 10th Overall Tour of Szeklerland
1st Stage 1
2013
 1st Stage 2 Sibiu Cycling Tour
 2nd Overall Circuit des Ardennes
 2nd Overall Oberösterreich Rundfahrt
 2nd Banja Luka–Beograd II
 6th Grand Prix Südkärnten
 9th Raiffeisen Grand Prix
2014
 An Post Rás
1st  Mountains classification
1st Stage 6
 1st Stage 4 Tour de Bretagne
 3rd Grand Prix Südkärnten
 3rd Raiffeisen Grand Prix
 6th Overall Tour de Taiwan
2015
 1st  Overall Istrian Spring Trophy
1st Stage 2
 5th Odessa Grand Prix II
 9th Tour of Almaty
2016
 1st  Overall Tour d'Azerbaïdjan
 1st Stage 1 Istrian Spring Trophy
 2nd GP Izola
 3rd Overall Oberösterreich Rundfahrt
1st Points classification
1st Stage 3
 5th Overall Rhône-Alpes Isère Tour
 6th Poreč Trophy
 7th Overall Tour of Austria
 8th Overall Tour of Croatia
 9th Overall Circuit des Ardennes
 10th Overall Okolo Slovenska
1st Stage 3
2017
 3rd Overall Oberösterreich Rundfahrt
 3rd GP Kranj
 10th Overall Rhône-Alpes Isère Tour
2018
 4th Overall Rhône-Alpes Isère Tour
 6th Overall Istrian Spring Trophy
 7th GP Laguna

References

External links 
 Team Elkhaus

1984 births
Living people
Austrian male cyclists
People from Judenburg
Sportspeople from Styria